Defending champion Shingo Kunieda defeated Gustavo Fernández in the final, 6–0, 6–1 to win the men's singles wheelchair tennis title at the 2014 Australian Open. It was his seventh Australian Open singles title and 15th major singles title overall.

Seeds
  Shingo Kunieda (champion)
  Stéphane Houdet (semifinals)

Draw

References 

General

 Drawsheets on ausopen.com

Specific

Wheelchair Men's Singles
2014 Men's Singles